Bobby Clack (January 3, 1926 – April 3, 1986) was an American film actor during the Western B-movies era. Sometimes he is credited as Bobby Clark or Dusty Dixon. His father, Arnold Clack, also was a film actor.

Clack was born in Spiro, Oklahoma, and died in Oregon at the age of 60.

Selected filmography
 Trigger Smith (1939)
 Overland with Kit Carson (1939)
 The Sagebrush Family Trails West (1940)
 Rim of the Canyon (1949)
 Rio Grande (1949)
 Sons of New Mexico (1949) 
 Beyond the Purple Hills (1950)
 Silver Canyon (1951) 
 Rodeo King and the Senorita (1951)
 The Old West (1952)
 Barbed Wire (1952)

Sources

1926 births
1986 deaths
People from Spiro, Oklahoma
American male film actors
Male actors from Oklahoma
20th-century American male actors